Jakub Jugas (born 5 May 1992) is a Czech professional footballer who plays as a centre-back for Ekstraklasa side Cracovia.

Club career
He made his league debut on 28 August 2010 in Zlín's 0–2 Czech National Football League away loss against Sparta Prague B. He scored his first league goal on 17 August 2013 in the 4–0  home win against Baník Ostrava. He won the Czech FA Cup with Zlín in 2017.

Slavia Prague
In May 2017, after a fierce competition for his signature, he decided to join Slavia Prague for the 2017–18 Fortuna Liga season for a reported transfer fee of €570,000 plus future incentives.

On 9 May 2018 he played as Slavia Prague won the 2017–18 Czech Cup final against Jablonec.

In February 2019, he joined Mladá Boleslav on loan until the end of the season.

International career
He represented Czech Republic on every youth level from the Under-16 team, except Under-20. He was a part of the Czech Republic U-19 squad that won silver medals in the 2011 UEFA Under-19 European Championship in Romania. On 30 June 2017, he was called up to the senior Czech national team to face Belgium and Norway.

Career statistics

Honours
 Zlín
Czech Cup: 2016–17

Slavia Prague
 Czech Cup: 2017–18

References

External links
 
 Jakub Jugas official international statistics
 

Czech footballers
Czech Republic youth international footballers
Czech Republic under-21 international footballers
Czech Republic international footballers
1992 births
Living people
Czech National Football League players
Czech First League players
Ekstraklasa players
FC Zbrojovka Brno players
FC Fastav Zlín players
1. FK Příbram players
FK Mladá Boleslav players
FK Jablonec players
SK Slavia Prague players
FC Slovan Liberec players
MKS Cracovia (football) players
People from Otrokovice
Association football defenders
Expatriate footballers in Poland
Czech expatriate sportspeople in Poland
Sportspeople from the Zlín Region